Events in the year 1848 in India.

Incumbents
The Marquess of Dalhousie, Governor-General, 1848-56.

Events
 2nd Sikh War, 1848-49.
 Annexation of Sattara.

Law
 Indian Insolvency Act

Births
28 September – Kabibar Radhanath Ray, poet (died 1908).

See also

References

 
India
Years of the 19th century in India